The Lord High Treasurer was an English government position and has been a British government position since the Acts of Union of 1707. A holder of the post would be the third-highest-ranked Great Officer of State in England, below the Lord High Steward and the Lord High Chancellor of Great Britain.

The Lord High Treasurer functions as the head of His Majesty's Treasury. The office has, since the resignation of Charles Talbot, 1st Duke of Shrewsbury in 1714, been vacant.

Although the United Kingdom of Great Britain and Ireland was created in 1801, it was not until the Consolidated Fund Act 1816 that the separate offices of Lord High Treasurer of Great Britain and Lord High Treasurer of Ireland were united into one office as the 'Lord High Treasurer of the United Kingdom of Great Britain and Ireland' on 5 January 1817.

Section 2 of the Consolidated Fund Act 1816 also provides that "whenever there shall not be [a Lord High Treasurer of the United Kingdom of Great Britain and Ireland], it shall ... be lawful for His Majesty, by letters patent under the Great Seal of Great Britain, to appoint Commissioners for executing the Offices of Treasurer of the Exchequer of Great Britain and Lord High Treasurer of Ireland". These are the Lords Commissioners of the Treasury. In modern times, by convention, the Lords Commissioners of the Treasury include the Prime Minister of the United Kingdom, usually serving as the First Lord of the Treasury, and the Chancellor of the Exchequer, serving as the Second Lord of the Treasury. Other members of the government, usually whips in the House of Commons, are appointed to serve as the Junior Lords Commissioners of the Treasury.

Origins 
The English Treasury seems to have come into existence around 1126, during the reign of Henry I, as the financial responsibilities were separated from the rest of the job that evolved into Lord Great Chamberlain. The Treasury was originally a section of the Royal Household with custody of the King's money. In 1216, a Treasurer was appointed to take control of the Treasury in Winchester. The Treasurer was also an officer of the Exchequer, and supervised the royal accounts. It was in the 16th century, the office's title of King's Treasurer developed into Lord High Treasurer. By Tudor times, the Lord High Treasurer had achieved a place among the Great Officers of State, behind the Lord Chancellor and above the Master of the Horse. Under the Treason Act 1351 it is treason to kill him.

The office of Lord High Treasurer is distinct from that of Treasurer of the Exchequer. The Lord High Treasurer was appointed by the delivery of a white staff to the appointee, and the Treasurer of the Exchequer was appointed at His Majesty's pleasure by letters patent under the Great Seal of the Realm. However, when the Treasury was held by an individual, he was appointed to both offices. It is the office of Treasurer of the Exchequer that is put into commission, not the office of Lord High Treasurer. When the office of Treasurer of the Exchequer is put into commission, the office of Lord High Treasurer is left vacant.

During the sixteenth century, the Lord High Treasurer was often considered the most important official of the government, and became a de facto Prime Minister. Exemplifying the power of the Lord High Treasurer is William Cecil, 1st Baron Burghley, who served in the post from 1572 to 1598. During his tenure, he dominated the administration under Elizabeth I.

List

Commission system 

A system exists for appointing Lords Commissioners to the Treasury Board, which has hardly varied. The First Lord of the Treasury is the Prime Minister, and the Second Lord of the Treasury is the Chancellor of the Exchequer, who has inherited most of the functional financial responsibilities of the Lord High Treasurer. Next rank the Junior Lords of the Treasury who, though theoretically members of the Treasury Board, in practice serve as government whips under the Parliamentary Secretary to the Treasury (Chief Whip).

See also 
 List of Lord High Treasurers
 List of Lords Commissioners of the Treasury

References

Citations

Sources 

 

 
Monarchy and money